Broughton railway station served the village of Broughton, Lancashire, England, from June to November 1840 on the Lancaster and Preston Junction Railway.

History 
The station opened on 26 June 1840 by the Lancaster and Preston Junction Railway.

References

External links 

Disused railway stations in the City of Preston
Railway stations in Great Britain opened in 1840
Railway stations in Great Britain closed in 1840
1840 establishments in England
1840 disestablishments in England
Broughton, Lancashire